Yeni Novruzlu is a village and municipality in the Saatly Rayon of Azerbaijan. It has a population of 881.

References

Populated places in Saatly District